Haley Marie Gorecki (born on November 13, 1996) is an American basketball player for Casademont Zaragoza of La Liga Feminina. She played college basketball for the Duke Blue Devils. Gorecki was selected to third team All-American by the U.S. Basketball Writers Association (USBWA) and All-America Honorable Mention by the Associated Press (AP) in 2020. Coming out of high school, she was Ms. Basketball of Illinois in 2015 as well as the state's Gatorade Player of the Year.

College career
Gorecki appeared in 14 games as a freshman before a right hip injury sidelined her for the rest of the 2015–16 season. She red-shirted in 2016–17 and returned in the 2017–18 season to average 42.3% in 3-point shooting before another injury sidelined her once again after 23 games. Gorecki graduated in 2019 but returned for the 2019–20 season as a graduate student.

Professional career

WNBA
Gorecki was selected 31st overall by the Seattle Storm in the 2020 WNBA draft. On May 26, she was waived by the Storm.

On February 23, 2021, Gorecki signed a training camp contract with the Storm. She did not make the team and was waived at the end of training camp.

On May 27, 2021, Gorecki was signed to a hardship contract with the Phoenix Mercury. She played three games for them, before being released.

Overseas
In July 2021, Gorecki signed with Casademont Zaragoza. During the 2020 season with Casademont Zaragoza, Gorecki averaged 9.0 points and 4.3 rebounds a game.

WNBA career statistics

Regular season

|-
| align="left" | 2021
| align="left" | Phoenix
| 3 || 0 || 2.0 || .000 || .000 || .000 || 0.7 || 0.0 || 0.0 || 0.0 || 0.3 || 0.0
|-
| align="left" | Career
| align="left" | 1 years, 1 team
| 3 || 0 || 2.0 || .000 || .000 || .000 || 0.7 || 0.0 || 0.0 || 0.0 || 0.3 || 0.0

Career statistics

College

|-
| style="text-align:left; |2015–16
| style="text-align:left;"|Duke
| 14 || 1 || 16.2 || .278 || .222 || .882 || 2.6 || 1.1 || 1.1 || .1 || 1.8 || 4.5
|-
| style="text-align:left;"|2017–18
| style="text-align:left;"|Duke
| 23 || 13 || 25.0 || .423 || .423 || .717 || 3.9 || 2.9 || 1.3 || .2 || 2.1 || 11.0
|-
| style="text-align:left;"|2018–19
| style="text-align:left;"|Duke
| 30 || 30 || 36.0 || .365 || .279 || .719 || 7.1 || 3.9 || 2.6 || .3 || 3.6 || 17.2
|-
| style="text-align:left;"|2019–20
| style="text-align:left;"|Duke
| 30 || 30 || 36.5 || .397 || .337 || .856 || 6.6 || 4.4 || 2.1 || .6 || 3.8 || 18.5
|- class="sortbottom"
| style="text-align:center;" colspan="2"|Career
| 97 || 74 || 30.7 || .381 || .323 || .788 || 5.5 || 3.4 || 1.9 || .3 || 3.1 || 14.3

Source: goduke.com

Personal life
Gorecki is the daughter of Adam and Denise Gorecki.She have a Polish roots from father side. She has a sister, Brittany and a brother, Adam. Górecki holds a degree in Psychology from Duke.

References

1996 births
Living people
All-American college women's basketball players
American expatriate basketball people in Spain
American women's basketball players
Basketball players from Illinois
Duke Blue Devils women's basketball players
People from Hoffman Estates, Illinois
Phoenix Mercury players
Seattle Storm draft picks
Shooting guards